The United Auto Workers, or UAW, is an American labor union.

UAW may also refer to:
 Under Accumulator of Wealth, a term used in the book The Millionaire Next Door
 Union of American Women, women's association founded in 1934
 Union of Australian Women, Australian women's organisation
 Universe at War: Earth Assault, a RTS video game by Petroglyph Games
 Urban Assault Weapon, a weapons program